Gela Yelizbarovich Dzagoyev (born 31 January 1988) is a former Russian professional footballer of Ossetian descent.

Club career
He played in the Russian Football National League for FC KAMAZ Naberezhnye Chelny in 2009.

Personal life
He is the older brother of Alan Dzagoyev.

External links

1988 births
Sportspeople from Vladikavkaz
Living people
Russian footballers
Association football midfielders
FC Spartak Vladikavkaz players
FC KAMAZ Naberezhnye Chelny players
FC Chertanovo Moscow players